Posyolok sovkhoza AMO is a rural locality (a settlement) and the administrative center of Amovskoye Rural Settlement, Novoanninsky District, Volgograd Oblast, Russia. The population was 782 as of 2010. There are 19 streets.

Geography 
The settlement is located in steppe on the Khopyorsko-Buzulukskaya Plain, 9 km southeast of Novoanninsky (the district's administrative centre) by road. Novoanninsky is the nearest rural locality.

References 

Rural localities in Novoanninsky District